The 2021 3 Hours of Nürburgring was a motor racing event for the GT World Challenge Europe Endurance Cup, held on the weekend of 3 to 5 September 2021. The event was held on the Nürburgring in Nürburg, Rhineland-Palatinate, Germany and consisted of a single race, three hours in length. It was the fourth event in the 2021 GT World Challenge Europe Endurance Cup.

Results

Qualifying

 – Cameron contested Qualifying 1 and 2 for Car No. 53.

Race

References

External links
Official website
Race replay

|- style="text-align:center"
|width="35%"|Previous race:
|width="30%"|GT World Challenge Europe Endurance Cup2021 season
|width="40%"|Next race:

Nürburgring
3 Hours of Nürburgring
3 Hours of Nürburgring